The National Convocation on the Challenge of Building Peace was an American organization formed in the late 1960s in response to the Vietnam War. The organization made the master list of Nixon political opponents. The first meeting, sponsored by the Fund for Education in World Order, was held on March 5, 1969 in New York City. They held their second meeting in 1970 in New York City, and had annual meetings beginning in 1986.

Convocations
 1st: New York Hilton Hotel, New York City, New York, March 1969
 2nd: New York Hilton Hotel, New York City, New York, April 29–30, 1970
 3rd: Hotel Americana, New York City, New York, October 1971

References

MINNESOTA POLITICS OF THE LEFT Papers, 1968-1974, [1018]: the Second National Convocation on the Challenge of Building Peace, Minnesota BiPartisan Caucus to Stop the War, and Minnesotans for Amnesty.
 Electronic Guide to the Administrative Records of the Division of World Peace of the General Board of Church and Society 1444-4-2:25: National Convocation on The Challenge of Building Peace, 1968–1969
Contemporary Practice of the United States Relating to International Law, American Journal of International Law, Vol. 64, No. 4 (Oct., 1970), pp. 928–947
 Valley Peace Center Records, 1967-1973: National Convocation on the Challenge of Building Peace, New York, 1969. First..., condensed transcript. (N.Y.?); Fund for Education in World Order, (1969?). 63 pp.

External links
Recording of the Luncheon Session at the 1st Convocation at The WNYC Archives
Recording of the 1st session at the 1st Convocation, "Is America Becoming a Militaristic Society? at The WNYC Archives

Peace organizations based in the United States
Anti–Vietnam War groups